Arthur Heath (7 February 1890 – 19 February 1954) was an Australian rules footballer who played for the Richmond Football Club in the Victorian Football League (VFL).

Notes

External links 

1890 births
1954 deaths
Australian rules footballers from Victoria (Australia)
Richmond Football Club players